Devali is a village in the Thane district of Maharashtra, India. It is located in the Bhiwandi taluka. It lies on the Wada-Malwada Road.

Demographics 

According to the 2011 census of India, Devali has 108 households. The effective literacy rate (i.e. the literacy rate of population excluding children aged 6 and below) is 78.83%.

References 

Villages in Bhiwandi taluka